Neophyte (Simon Hall) is a fictional mutant super villain appearing in American comic books published by Marvel Comics. The character is depicted as a member of the Acolytes.

Fictional character biography
Neophyte is a shy, quiet mutant with the ability to phase his body and others, allowing complete intangibility and high-speed transport through inanimate matter. Discovered by Cargill, Unuscione, and Milan in an abandoned church in Switzerland while praying for something to believe in, he accepted their invitation to join the group of Magneto followers known as the Acolytes. The youngest member of the group, he was assigned tasks of little importance and did not accompany the other Acolytes into battle. He was put in charge of feeding the captive Moira MacTaggert, but eventually discovered through her that their de facto leader, Fabian Cortez, had secretly murdered Magneto (though it would later be revealed that Magneto actually survived the attempt). Cortez used his own mutant power to amplify the powers of others to uncontrollable levels to jettison Neophyte from their headquarters, where he fell into a grotto. A woman came to his rescue, although he was confused about why a human would help a mutant. Suddenly, a trio of Acolytes appeared and killed the woman. This act caused him to rethink his loyalties towards Fabian Cortez and the Acolytes. He agreed to use his knowledge and powers to aid the X-Men in infiltrating the Acolytes' base of operations. After the conflict Neophyte was offered sanctuary with the X-Men, but declined the offer and departed alone to search for meaning on his own terms.

Eventually, Neophyte was captured by the Acolytes and put on trial for the crime of treason after aiding the X-Men. The former X-Man Colossus decided to defend Neophyte in his case, opting for a second chance for the boy instead of the penalty of death that most of the other Acolytes wished for. Neophyte felt hopeless, fully expecting to be executed. Being prosecuted by Amelia Voght and judged by Exodus, Neophyte claimed the Acolytes as hypocrites, as they preached Magneto's way but were guilty of doing the same hatred and violence as those they condemned. When he mentioned Professor Charles Xavier's name, the Acolytes were sent into an uproar, only to be stopped by Exodus, who stated that Neophyte's death would only occur after the trial. Colossus stepped forward and managed to convince Exodus to banish Neophyte from Avalon, teleporting him back to Earth.

Neophyte eventually returns to the Acolytes' ranks after Magneto resurfaces. Still among the more compassionate members, he is frequently ridiculed and is thought of as weak by several others. On the battlefield, however, he held his own, and proved to be a useful teammate.

After M-Day
Neophyte was one of the few mutants to survive Cassandra Nova's Sentinel attack on Genosha. Neophyte retained his mutant powers during the M-Day, and appeared briefly during X-Men: Messiah Complex among a small group of Acolytes.

Later he moved to Utopia and was seen among the group of mutants, which were assembled by Cyclops to fight the invasion of Nimrods.

Powers and abilities
Neophyte is a phase-morpher, able to travel distances through mass by breaking down his physical structure and entering a solid material. When in contact with matter, Neophyte relaxes the molecular bonding forces in his body so that his molecules merge with the object he's touching in a non-substantial state. He can then cause the mass of his body to reform itself at a different angle or position to emerge from the object. When the Acolytes were based in a large French castle, he could merge his mass with one stone wall of the castle and reform himself a moment later out of any of the connecting stone surfaces. Later, on the rocky hillside of Wundagore, Neophyte could almost instantly relocate himself across the landscape by merging with the uniform earth and rock of the area. He could also separate his mass into multiple small masses, such as when he jumped off a balcony and disappeared into a rainstorm by dividing his mass up into the rain, only to reform later as the rain hit the ground below. He is able to carry several other people with him as he travels in this state, acting as a means of high-speed transport. The maximum distance he can travel and the maximum amount of mass he can transport are unknown.

Other versions

Age of X
In the Age of X reality, Neophyte is briefly mentioned in a report. After being captured, he is interrogated and forced to give information on Legacy and Magneto.

References

External links
 Neophyte at Marvel Wiki
 UncannyXmen.net Character Profile on Neophyte

Characters created by John Romita Jr.
Characters created by Scott Lobdell
Comics characters introduced in 1993
Fictional characters who can turn intangible
Marvel Comics mutants
Marvel Comics supervillains